Alan Ball  may refer to:

 Alan Ball (screenwriter) (born 1957), American screenwriter and director
 Alan Ball Sr. (1924–1982), English footballer and manager
 Alan Ball Jr. (1945–2007), English footballer and manager, winner of the 1966 FIFA World Cup
 Alan Ball (American football) (born 1985), American football player
 Alan Ball (weightlifter) (born 1943), American Olympic weightlifter

See also:

 Allan Ball (1943–2018), English footballer with Queen of the South